André Gerin (born 19 January 1946 in Vienne, Isère) is a French politician who is currently a Deputy in the National Assembly of France.  He has been elected in the Rhône department,  and is a member of the French Communist Party.

References

1946 births
Living people
Politicians from Vienne, Isère
French Communist Party politicians
Deputies of the 10th National Assembly of the French Fifth Republic
Deputies of the 11th National Assembly of the French Fifth Republic
Deputies of the 12th National Assembly of the French Fifth Republic
Deputies of the 13th National Assembly of the French Fifth Republic